Silvestre is a 1981 Portuguese drama film directed by João César Monteiro. It was the debut film of Maria de Medeiros.

The film was entered into the main competition at the 38th edition of the Venice Film Festival.

Plot

Cast  
   
Maria de Medeiros  as  Sílvia / Silvestre
Teresa Madruga  as  Susana
Luís Miguel Cintra  as  Pilgrim / Knight / D. Raimundo
 Jorge Silva Melo   as  D. Paio
 João Guedes  as  D. Rodrigo
 Xosé Maria Straviz   as Lt. Alferes 
 Ruy Furtado  as Matias
 Raquel Maria as Marta
 Cucha Carvalheiro   as Elsa

References

External links

1981 drama films
1981 films
Portuguese drama films
Films produced by Paulo Branco